The Sawtooth Mountains are a range of hills or small mountains on the North Shore of Lake Superior in the U.S. state of Minnesota, extending about  from Carlton Peak near Tofte on the west, to Grand Marais on the east.

Description

The Sawtooth Mountains are part of the North Shore Highlands, an area of rugged topography along the North Shore of Lake Superior in central North America.  The Sawtooths rise from the lake at angles between 8 and 20 degrees and drop off steeply on their north sides.
  They received their name as a result of their relatively uniform size, angles, and regularity of spacing; seen from Lake Superior to the east, "the visible crest line thus presents a remarkable profile, resembling the teeth of an immense saw."

From the west, rising from the Temperance River, major prominences are Carlton Peak above Temperance River State Park, Leveaux Mountain and a knob immediately across the Onion River, Moose Mountain, the Eagle Mountain at Lutsen, peaks along a ridge above Cascade River State Park, Murphy Mountain, and Sawtooth Bluff above Grand Marais.

Tourism
In addition to the uplands, the Sawtooths are home to many rivers, waterfalls, and parks. Wildlife is abundant and includes eagles, hawks, deer, moose, and many small mammals. Some of the notable sites include:

 Cascade River State Park
 Judge C.R. Magney State Park
 Superior Hiking Trail
 Superior National Forest
 Temperance River State Park

Lutsen Mountains Ski Resort is located in the Sawtooths, just northwest of the town of Lutsen; the area includes Moose Mountain, one of the higher peaks of the range, and Eagle Mountain (to be distinguished from the other Eagle Mountain in Cook County, the highest peak in the state, and located well inland from the lakeshore).

Notes

Sources
 
 Upham, Warren (2001) Minnesota Place Names, A Geographical Encyclopedia, Third Edition; MHS Press; .

External links

Mountain ranges of Minnesota
Landforms of Cook County, Minnesota
Grand Marais, Minnesota